PK is a 2014 Indian Hindi-language  science-fiction comedy-drama film edited and directed by Rajkumar Hirani and written by Hirani and Abhijat Joshi, and jointly produced by Hirani and Vidhu Vinod Chopra under the banners Rajkumar Hirani Films and Vinod Chopra Films respectively. The plot follows an innocent alien (Aamir Khan) who lands on Earth but loses his communication device. He meets Jaggu (Anushka Sharma), a heartbroken reporter, and tries to find his device. With time, he raises many thought-provoking questions.

After the success of 3 Idiots (2009), Hirani and Joshi began scripting their next project; finding similarities with the plot of Inception (2010), they scrapped the film. It was later rewritten with a different angle and tone. During production, the film was initially titled Talli and later Ek Tha Talli before being changed to Disney's PK as the latter title was found to be too similar to Ek Tha Tiger (2012). The film's soundtrack was composed by Shantanu Moitra, Ajay–Atul and Ankit Tiwari with lyrics written by Swanand Kirkire, Amitabh Varma and Manoj Muntashir. UTV Motion Pictures and Walt Disney Pictures acquired the distribution rights of the film. PK was the first Bollywood film to be shot in Belgium.

PK was released on 19 December 2014. Upon release, it received positive reviews, with praise directed towards Khan's performance and the film's humour. The film received 8 nominations at the 60th Filmfare Awards, winning two. Additionally, it won five Producers Guild Film Awards, and two Screen Awards. PK garnered the Telstra People's Choice Award at the Indian Film Festival of Melbourne. Produced on a budget of 1.22 billion, PK was the first Indian film to gross more than 7 billion and US$100 million worldwide. At the time of its release, it emerged as the highest-grossing Indian film of all time. The film's final worldwide gross was 769.89 crore (US$118.92 million). It currently stands as the 8th highest grossing Indian film of all time. and 9th highest-grossing film in India.

Plot 
An android alien lands on Earth naked on a research mission in Rajasthan but is stranded when the remote control for his spaceship is stolen. He manages to get the thief's cassette recorder. On the same day in Belgium, an Indian woman, Jagat Janani Sahni alias Jaggu, meets a Pakistani, Sarfaraz Yousuf, and falls in love with him. Jaggu's father objects to their relationship, citing difference in their religions. He consults godman Tapasvi Maharaj who predicts that Sarfaraz will betray Jaggu. Determined to prove them wrong, Jaggu asks Sarfaraz to marry her. At the wedding, she is heartbroken when she receives an unsigned letter, believing it is from Sarfaraz, calling off the wedding due to cultural differences.

Jaggu returns to India and becomes a news reporter. She meets the alien and is intrigued to see him distribute leaflets about the "missing" God. She earns his trust by rescuing him when he attempts to take money from a temple's collection box as a refund on God's broken promises. The alien tells her that he is an 'astronaut' from another planet. His people know nothing about dressing, religion, or verbal communication; they transfer ideas by holding hands.

A flashback shows how, after being accidentally hit by a truck, the alien is befriended by bandmaster Bhairon Singh, who takes him along with his troop. Bhairon takes him to a brothel, where the alien holds a prostitute Phuljhadiya's hand for six hours and thus learns the Bhojpuri language. The alien begins speaking, and after learning of the whole scenario, Bhairon tells him that his thief may be in Delhi. The alien leaves for Delhi. Due to his strange behaviour, people assume he is drunk and call him "peekay" or "PK" (Hindi for drunk); the alien adopts PK as a name (his people have no language and thus no names). People tell PK that only "God" can help him find his remote. He sincerely practices Indian religions, including Hinduism, Sikhism, Christianity and Islam, attempting to find "God", to no avail. He later discovers that Tapasvi has his remote, who claims it was a gift from God and refuses to return it. Jaggu promises PK that she will recover his remote and he can go back home.

PK conjectures, as Jaggu plays a prank on an unknown caller, that Tapasvi and other godmen must be dialling a "wrong number" to communicate with God and are advising the public to engage in meaningless rituals. Jaggu encourages the public to expose fraudulent godmen by sending their videos to her news channel. This "wrong number" campaign turns into a popular mass movement, to the dismay of Tapasvi. Meanwhile, Bhairon finds the thief and contacts PK, telling him that he sold his remote to Tapasvi. PK realises that Tapasvi was a fraud all along and that it was not a "wrong number". Bhairon brings the thief to Delhi, but both die in a terrorist attack.

Tapasvi decides to confront PK on-air. Tapasvi asks PK what the "right number" is. PK says that "God created us all" is the only concept people should believe in and that the other "duplicate Gods" are artificial. Tapasvi argues, saying that PK is trying to take people away from their Gods and that they will not stand for their Gods being taken away. He claims he has a direct connection to God and refers to his prediction of Sarfaraz's betrayal to try to prove that Muslims are liars. PK, having absorbed Jaggu's memories earlier, realises that Sarfaraz did not write the letter to Jaggu.

Jaggu contacts the Pakistani Embassy in Belgium where Sarfaraz worked part-time. The embassy receptionist tells her that Sarfaraz has been annoying the embassy officials by repeatedly asking if they received a call from Delhi, implying that he still loves Jaggu. That day, Sarfaraz found the same letter and thought it was from Jaggu, and did not call her as he understood she was under familial pressure. Jaggu and Sarfaraz reconnect, and Tapasvi is forced by Jaggu's father to return PK's remote.

Meanwhile, PK has fallen in love with Jaggu but refrains from telling her because she loves Sarfaraz. Having filled multiple audio tapes with her voice alone, he takes two suitcases full of tapes and extra batteries when leaving for home. He lies to Jaggu that the tapes contain a variety of Earthly noises which he will miss, such as crows and car horns. Jaggu realises his love for her by seeing the note he wrote for her earlier but does not directly confront him about it. PK does not even look back while going as he doesn't want her to see him in tears which will give away his love for her. After his departure, Jaggu publishes a book about him, with Sarfaraz and her family assisting.

One year later, PK returns to Earth on a new research mission on human nature with more members of his species.

Cast and characters

Production

Development 

After the success of 3 Idiots, director Rajkumar Hirani and writer Abhijat Joshi started work for the next project. They had written a story about a character who had the ability to get into another person's mind to make that person a better human being. They spent one year to write a story, but it turned out to be similar to Inception (2010). After watching Inception, Hirani and Joshi were shocked by the similarities. Eventually, they decided to scrap the film, then Hirani and Joshi reworked on the script, changing the entire tone and angle. It took five years to make the film and three years to write it.

In PK, Khan played nine avatars and, during the course of the film, the actor had to chew over 10,000 betelnut preparations called paan. Betelnut is a psychoactive stimulant used throughout Asia and characterized by its ability to stain users' mouths red. "In real life paan is not a habit, I have it once in a while but for this film I chew paan for every scene. I would at times eat about 100 paans in a day. We had a paanwala [a paan maker] on the sets," said Khan in the report. For every take, Khan had to eat a fresh paan to fill his mouth. Before beginning the shoot, he would eat at least 10–15 paans to get the right color inside his mouth and on his lips.

Viral Thakkar was the visual effects supervisor. The visual effects company was Riva Digital at a point employing 100 artists working on the film.

Casting 
In 2011, Aamir Khan and Anushka Sharma signed on for the film. Khan's nephew Imran Khan and Ranbir Kapoor were considered for a role which eventually went to Sushant Singh Rajput before the release of his debut movie Kai Po Che (2013). Earlier reports said that Rajkumar Hirani had signed Arshad Warsi for the film when it was reported that Arshad will be playing an important role. In 2013, Warsi said in an interview "I couldn't have worked out on dates. I wouldn't refuse Raju for anything. In fact, when he offered me the film, I did not even ask for the script, I was like I am ready to come on whenever you want. So that is the connection I share with Raju." Before Rajput and Warsi were signed on, R. Madhavan and Sharman Joshi were said to be cast in the film. Junaid Khan, son of Aamir Khan worked as an assistant director in this film.

Characters 
 PK: The titular character was written to be a Chaplinesque, bumbling alien and meant to provide an outside view to the quirks and hypocrisies of the Indian society. To further accentuate the alien look, Khan developed a distinct appearance and mannerisms including wearing green contact lenses and not blinking while talking. Khan learned Bhojpuri for the role with the help of the language expert Shanti Bhushan. Rajkumar Hirani said in an interview, "When we write a script we usually visualize the characters in the film. How they look, talk and walk. But PK is one such character which was very difficult to visualize. We didn't have a reference point. PK was one such character, who didn't have a reference point. A character like him wasn't there in any book, nor did we meet someone like him in real life. We only knew that we wanted the character to be innocent and child-like. Now the question was, who is that actor who could look like a child. Someone who is perfect for the role of PK. The answer was obvious – Aamir Khan."
 Jagat "Jaggu" Janani: PK's friend and confidante, Jaggu is a television news reporter and is instrumental in spreading PK's message. She was envisioned as a fun-loving yet mature and independent woman. The producers wanted a distinct look for Jaggu and ended up trying several options over a few days before settling on one. Sharma said in an interview "Raju Sir wanted me to look happy, chirpy and peppy in PK. Keeping his brief in mind, the team came up with this look." She revealed that she was not required to cut her hair by remarking, "I have long hair, so hair stylists just wrapped my hair and tucked inside the wig".
 Bhairon Singh: Makers wanted somebody tall and sturdy for the role of Bhairon Singh and that's why Sanjay came in the picture. Vidhu Vinod Chopra shared, "The character Bhairon Singh is shown to be PK's good friend. The idea was that since PK is a tiny person, we wanted someone who in contrast is very huge. Such that, when Bhairon hugs PK, it looks funny as the tiny man would go completely unnoticed in Bhairon's arms."

Title 
In 2011, in its initial scripting stage, Hirani named the film Talli, then changed it to Ek Tha Talli which he loved, but later on came to know that Ek Tha Tiger was already in production (released in 2012). He dropped the idea and, after many titles, he came up with a title that only had initials, PK. After starting the film, Hirani felt PK was not a good enough title. He decided to change the title to Talli. But after a few weeks of shooting, Hirani decided to go back to the original title.

Themes 
Firstpost compared PK to Hirani and Khan's previous collaboration 3 Idiots, as they both involve "A socially awkward and 'different' young man—who walks and talks in a strange, enthusiastic childlike manner—observes the system, questions it, asks you to look at the many ludicrous things that inform it, and eventually brings about a minor revolution."

Filming 
According to Hirani, PK is a "satire on Hindu gods and their godmen". The co-director Khan began looking for shooting locations in July 2012. Second unit filming was set to begin in late 2012, which was stalled after the rumoured departure of three department heads for the film and bad weather stalling initial shoots. Hirani denied rumours that the film would be delayed, stating that principal filming had always been intended to begin in mid-January 2013 in Delhi and Rajasthan to "capture the winter of Delhi".

Shooting officially began on 1 February 2013, with the filming scheduled to occur over a 45-day period. A one-week schedule of shooting of PK was in June 2013 in Bruges, Belgium. A 26-day schedule of shooting of PK started in Delhi from 27 September 2013.

Marketing 

The film was marketed by a Mumbai Based company named Spice PR owned by Prabhat Choudhary.

The makers released a teaser trailer on 23 October 2014. It achieved 3.4 million views on YouTube within five days, subsequently receiving 12 million views. It was regarded as the most viewed movie trailers on YouTube. The teaser was attached with the film Happy New Year (2014).

In August, the makers found a new promotional strategy to interact with the audiences by introducing talking standees. This was the first time a Bollywood film used a talking standee at varied locations as a part of its promotions. The standee had Khan talking to people in a prominent places in popular theatres and multiplexes.

On 7 December 2014, Khan began the city tour for promotions with Patna. The character he plays speaks in Bhojpuri which is the main language used for communication in Bihar. Aamir said at the event "I have decided to launch the promotional campaign of my film PK from Bihar to connect with the language. My character speaks Bhojpuri in the film." Hence, the actor decided to start his promotional schedule from Bihar. Although he wanted to visit Bhojpur, which is 60 kilometers from Bihar, he could not because of security issues. In Bihar he visited a litti chokha stall. The visit resulted in a surge of customers to the shop, and the shop owner put up pictures of Khan eating the local delicacy. Then the crew proceeded to Varanasi where they had a screening of their film 3 Idiots and interacted with the people. Khan made an impromptu visit to Krishana Paan shop to savor a Banarasi pan. The actor specially removed time from his schedule to visit this place. He enjoyed a "mitha banarasi paan" there. After the crew visited Delhi, Ahemdabad, Raipur, Jaipur, Hyderabad, Indore, Bangalore and other locations in India. Aamir and makers also promoted the film in Dubai.

PK: The Game 

Indiagames, a part of Disney India's Interactive business, announced the launch of the official mobile game 'PK' based on the film. On 14 December 2014, Aamir Khan, Anushka Sharma, Rajkumar Hirani, Vidhu Vinod Chopra, Siddharth Roy Kapur, managing director of Disney India and Sameer Ganapathy, VP and head, Interactive of Disney India launched the game at the Reliance Digital Store in Juhu amidst much fanfare.
 The game was developed for both feature phones and smartphones. It was launched on Google Play, iOS App Store and Windows platform. In the game, the player gets to don many avatars of Aamir Khan as seen in the movie, along with a special avatar of Anushka Sharma, as he embarks upon an exciting endless running adventure. Set against an Indian background, the gamer runs amidst the by-lanes of Delhi, railway tracks in a desert (as seen in the movie), and collect a maximum number of paans (as PK is seen enjoying eating paan in the movie). The gamer has to avoid a number of obstacles on the way, which include cows, buses, Delhi trains, rickshaws, traffic jams, and more. The backdrops in the game give the player the feel of the movie.

Release 
PK was earlier scheduled to release on 11 January 2015. The director (who is also editor of the film), Rajkumar Hirani, wanted to spend more time editing. Besides, some portions with Sanjay Dutt were yet to be shot. Also, the second season of Satyamev Jayate was to kick off from March. So Aamir Khan was not sure if he would be able to promote PK in June. Hence the makers settled for a December release.

PK was released on 19 December 2014, as the 200th Bollywood release in 2014. The release was later expanded to 6000 screens worldwide, which included 5200 screens in India and 844 screens overseas.

PK was initially released in 4844 screens worldwide. PK has been made tax-free in Uttar Pradesh and Bihar. PK is the widest Indian movie released in the U.K. (198 screens), Pakistan (over 70 screens), Australia (35 screens) and outside of India (844 screens in over 40 overseas markets). PK was released theatrically in China on 22 May 2015 across 4,600 screens. It had a dubbed Mandarin Chinese version, with Wang Baoqiang voicing Khan's role. The film was released in South Korea and Hong Kong on 3 September 2015, and in Japan on 29 October 2016.

Distribution 
DNA reported, "Being the first film to use Rentrak, Khan has taken the first initiative to bring in a paradigm shift from the usual norms followed in Bollywood. He had clearly enforced the idea of Rentrak to be brought in to bring more accuracy when it comes to box office figures."

Soundtrack 

The soundtrack is composed by Shantanu Moitra, Ajay–Atul and Ankit Tiwari with lyrics written by Swanand Kirkire, Amitabh Varma and Manoj Muntashir. The song "Tharki Chokro" is the first single, released on 24 October 2014. The video focuses on Aamir Khan and Sanjay Dutt, with the song sung by Swaroop Khan and composed by Ajay–Atul with lyrics penned by Swanand Kirkire. The second single, "Love Is a Waste of Time", which pictured Aamir Khan and Anushka Sharma, was released on 31 October 2014 on YouTube. The song is sung by Sonu Nigam and Shreya Ghoshal, composed by Shantanu Moitra with the lyrics of Amitabh Varma. "Chaar Kadam" was released on 2 November 2014 on the T-Series YouTube. The song is sung by Shaan and Shreya Ghoshal, composed by Shantanu Moitra with lyrics by Swanand Kirkire. The full soundtrack was released on 5 November 2014.

Track listing

Reception 
Srijana Mitra Das of The Times of India gave the movie 4 stars out of 5. Rajeev Masand of CNN-IBN gave 3.5 stars quoting "It's a courageous film that sticks to Hirani's well-oiled formula". NDTV gave 5 stars calling it "PK is a winner all the way, a film that Raj Kapoor, Bimal Roy and Guru Dutt would have been proud of had they been alive. Hirani is without a doubt their most worthy standard-bearer." Bollywood Hungama described it as "a solid entertainer that will surely entertain the masses and classes alike" and gave 4.5 out of 5 stars. Raja Sen of Rediff.com gave PK 4 out of 5 stars and called it "a triumph" and argued that Khan "soars high". However, Sukanya Verma of the same publication called the film "a mixed bag of spunk and sentimentality", while still giving it 3.5 out of 5 stars. Rohit Vats of Hindustan Times gave 4 out of 5 stars and said "Khan steals the show with his performance". Rohit Khilnani of India Today gave 4.5 stars, and said "Go watch the film & watch it ASAP!" Edmund Lee of South China Morning Post gave PK 3.5 stars. In Japan, Yuri Wakabayashi of Eiga gave the film a positive review in 2016.

In 2019, Film Companion ranked Khan's performance among the 100 best in Indian film for the past decade.

Box office 

PK had its box office figures tracked by Rentrak a United States-based company that specializes in audience measurements. PK became the first Bollywood film to earn  net from online bookings. PK grossed 183.09crore (US$28.955 million) worldwide in its first week. It became the highest-grossing Indian film, in both domestic as well as international markets. The film's final worldwide gross was 753.36 crore (US$million). It was the 71st highest-grossing film of 2014. PK was the first Indian film to gross more than 7 billion and US$100 million worldwide.

Domestic 
PK earned  net on its opening day. It showed growth on its second day, earning around  net. On its third day, the film brought in  net, bringing its weekend take to  net.

PK had the highest collections for a Hindi film on its first Monday, earning around  net. On Christmas Day the film earned   net, taking its first week total to  net.

On its second Friday, PK brought in around  net. With this, the film took its total to around  net and became the highest-grossing film in India in just 13 days. PK made an all-time record in the Mumbai circuit by grossing there more than  net.

International 
The film opened in 22 international markets during its opening weekend (19–21 December) and grossed $28.7 million, placing it at No. 3 at the worldwide box office behind The Hobbit: The Battle of the Five Armies and Gone with the Bullets. In North America, it set an opening weekend record for an Indian film collecting $3.75 million and placing at No. 10 at the box office. PK is the first Indian film to gross US$10 million in North America (US and Canada). The international gross was US$47.99 million ( 304.52 crore)—at the time, the highest-grossing Bollywood film of all time in international markets. In Pakistan, PK grossed  as of 10 January 2015.

East Asia 
PK had a second phase of overseas release in East Asia, most prominently in China. It became an instant hit, grossing US$5.14–5.3 million in first three days of release due to good word-of-mouth—a record for an Indian film (previously held by Dhoom 3), debuting at second place at the Chinese box office behind Avengers: Age of Ultron. PK became the highest-grossing Indian film in China in just 72 hours and grossed US$19.5 million (Rs 1.22 billion) in China. It became the first Indian film to pass the 100 million yuan ($16.11 million) threshold, which is considered rare for a non-Hollywood foreign film.

The film grossed ¥119million (US$20million) in China. In addition, it grossed US$0.3million in South Korea, US$870,000 in Hong Kong, and US$289,000 in Taiwan. PK was also a hit in Japan when it was released there in 2016, particularly in Tokyo; in Shinjuku, for example, it was the year's second highest-earning film at Cinema Qualite.

Records

Awards and nominations

Sequel 
Director Hirani has confirmed that a sequel will be made starring Khan and Ranbir Kapoor. He said, "We will make the sequel. We had shown Ranbir [Kapoor's character landing on the planet] towards the end of the film, so there is a story to tell. But Abhijat (Joshi, writer) has not written it yet. The day he writes it, we will make it."

Controversies 
When the shoot was going on in Chandni Chowk area of Delhi, an FIR was lodged against the makers of the film for allegedly hurting religious sentiments in October 2013. The objection was regarding a scene where a man dressed as the Hindu deity Shiva, pulls the rickshaw with two burqa clad women as passengers.

In July 2014, the film's poster sparked a controversy as it featured Aamir Khan posing almost nude with only a radio cassette recorder covering his genitals. Although the Central Board of Film Certification had cleared the film, a PIL was filed in the court by the All India Human Rights and Social Justice Front to ban its release saying it promoted nudity and vulgarity. The Supreme Court of India dismissed the plea and gave the film a green signal. A case was lodged against Aamir Khan and Rajkumar Hirani under section 295A in Rajasthan.

Activists of pro-Hindu organizations Vishwa Hindu Parishad and Bajrang Dal protested against certain scenes in the film, which they considered to be hurtful to the religious sentiments of the Hindu community as it showed Aamir Khan running behind Shiva. Subsequently, some theatres were vandalised by those activists, who demanded a ban on the movie and a Public Interest Litigation was filed against PK for the same. Amish Tripathi of Hindustan Times and Madhu Kishwar of Firstpost took issue with the film for mocking idolatry.

Swaroopanand Saraswati in January 2015 raised questions with the Censor Board about the film, demanding that the CBI investigate how the film received its certification from the Censor Board despite several members of the Board requesting that the film be reviewed again, but with no action taken.

The Sunni clerics of All India Muslim Personal Law Board demanded the removal of some scenes of the movie which they believed was hurting religious sentiments.

Government officials, such as the Uttar Pradesh chief minister Akhilesh Yadav and the then chief minister of Bihar Jitan Ram Manjhi exempted the film from entertainment tax to encourage wider viewership.

See also 

 List of highest-grossing Indian films—other high-grossing films
 List of films featuring extraterrestrials

Explanatory notes

Citations

External links 
 
 
 
 
 

2014 films
2010s Hindi-language films
2010s fantasy comedy-drama films
2010s musical comedy-drama films
Alien visitations in films
Films about journalism
Films about journalists
Films critical of religion
Telstra People's Choice Award winners
Films directed by Rajkumar Hirani
Films set in Bruges
Films set in Delhi
Films set in Rajasthan
Films shot in Delhi
Films shot in Rajasthan
Films scored by Ajay–Atul
Films scored by Ankit Tiwari
Films scored by Shantanu Moitra
Hinduism in pop culture-related controversies
Indian buddy comedy-drama films
Indian fantasy comedy-drama films
Indian religious comedy films
Religious controversies in film
Indian satirical films
Indian musical comedy-drama films
India–Pakistan relations in popular culture
Religious satire films
UTV Motion Pictures films
Films shot in Mandawa
2014 comedy films
2014 drama films
Films set in Belgium
Films shot in Belgium
Films shot in Bruges
Films set in Brussels
Films set in Flanders
Indian films set in New York City
Disney India films